Pfleger is a surname of German origin. People with that name include:

 Augustin Pfleger (1635 – at least 1686), German composer of Bohemian birth
 Helmut Pfleger (born 1943), German chess Grandmaster and author
 Michael Pfleger (born 1949), U.S. Roman Catholic priest and social activist

See also
 Pfleger, a mediaeval office holder in the Holy Roman Empire
 Pfleger Family Houses, a pair of historic homes in Cincinnati, Ohio
 

German-language surnames